The Government Science Technical College, idi, Gombe Gombe State, established in 1989, is a state owned Technical College under the management of the Gombe State Ministry for Education. The College awards Certificates in both Vocational and Professional Education.

History 
Various buildings provide facilities and instructional materials needed for teaching.

Programs 
Accredited courses offered in Government Technical College, Gombe. include

 NTC Catering Craft  Practice
 NTC Electrical Installation and Maintenance Work
 NTC Radio, Television & Electronics Work
 NTC Refrigeration & Air Conditioning

References 

Schools in Gombe State